Mufti Said Janan is a Pakistani politician from Hangu District who served as the member of the Khyber Pakhtunkhwa Assembly for the Jamiat Ulema-e-Islam (F). He also served as chairman and member of the different committees.

Political career
Mufti Said Janan was elected as the member of the Khyber Pakhtunkhwa Assembly on ticket of Jamiat Ulema-e-Islam (F) from PK-43 (Hangu-II) in 2013 Pakistani general election. 

He also contested the 2018 General Elections but he only managed to secure 44 votes.

References

Living people
Year of birth missing (living people)
Pashtun people
Jamiat Ulema-e-Islam (F) politicians
Khyber Pakhtunkhwa MPAs 2013–2018
People from Hangu District, Pakistan